Nogometni klub Jesenice, commonly referred to as NK Jesenice or simply Jesenice, is a Slovenian football club from Jesenice which competes in the Upper Carniolan League, the fourth highest league in Slovenia. The club got its present name in 1953 after the merger of NK Gregorčič and NK Bratstvo.

Honours
Slovenian Fourth Division
 Winners: 1993–94, 2002–03, 2010–11

Slovenian Fifth Division
 Winners: 2001–02, 2008–09

References

External links
Official website 

Association football clubs established in 1912
Football clubs in Slovenia
1912 establishments in Austria-Hungary
Sport in Jesenice, Jesenice